Anita Briem (born 29 May 1982) is an Icelandic actress. She is known for her role as Queen Jane Seymour on The Tudors and her role as Hannah Ásgeirsson in Journey to the Center of the Earth.

Personal life
Briem was born on 29 May 1982, in Reykjavík and is the daughter of drummer Gunnlaugur Briem of Mezzoforte and back-up vocalist Erna Þórarinsdóttir. She started acting when she was nine at the National Theatre of Iceland. She moved to England at the age of sixteen, graduating from the Royal Academy of Dramatic Art in London in 2004 having received the John Barton award in Stage Fighting. As a child she studied hand-to-hand combat and is trained in a variety of weaponry including the broadsword. She is married to actor/director Constantine Paraskevopoulos.

Career
Briem starred in Journey to the Center of the Earth as the female action hero lead, and also had major roles in the films Dylan Dog: Dead of Night (2011) and Elevator (2011).

She appeared in the second season of The Tudors, portraying King Henry VIII's third queen consort, Jane Seymour; she was replaced in the third season after the show was unable to work out conflicting dates with New Line Cinema over her previous commitment to the premiere and press for Journey to the Center of the Earth.

Film and television

References

External links
 
 Royal Academy of Dramatic Art Profile; Retrieved 7 May 2014
 References to Anita Briem and her unusual surname; Retrieved 7 May 2014

1982 births
Alumni of RADA
Living people
Anita Briem
Anita Briem
Anita Briem
Anita Briem
Anita Briem